Pinak Ghosh (born 20 January 1999) is a first-class cricketer from Bangladesh. In December 2015 he was named in Bangladesh's squad for the 2016 Under-19 Cricket World Cup.

In December 2017, he was named in Bangladesh's squad for the 2018 Under-19 Cricket World Cup. In November 2019, he was selected to play for the Chattogram Challengers in the 2019–20 Bangladesh Premier League. He made his Twenty20 debut for Chattogram Challengers in the 2019–20 Bangladesh Premier League on 31 December 2019.

References

External links
 

1999 births
Living people
Bangladeshi cricketers
Bangladeshi Hindus
Cricket Coaching School cricketers
Barisal Division cricketers
People from Mymensingh